Hilmir Rafn Mikaelsson (born 2 February 2004) is an Icelandic professional footballer who plays as a forward for Eliteserien club Tromsø, on loan from Venezia.

Club career

Early career 
Born in Iceland and raised in the village of Hvammstangi, Hilmir Rafn started his playing career at local grassroots club Kormákur, before joining Fjölnir at the age of 14, after a successful trial during a training camp in Spain with the under-14 team.

Venezia 
In August 2021, Hilmir Rafn joined Serie A side Venezia, initially on a season-long loan with an option to buy. After featuring for the club's under-19 side throughout the 2021-22 season, the forward made his Serie A debut on 22 May 2022, coming on as a substitute for Dennis Johnsen at the 73rd minute of a 0–0 draw against Cagliari. At the end of the league campaign, Venezia made their deal for Hilmir Rafn permanent.

On 7 August 2022, he was one of the fourteen youth players that received a call-up by head coach Ivan Javorčić for a Coppa Italia preliminary match against Ascoli, after thirteen members of Venezia's first-team tested positive for COVID-19. Having taken the place of Mirza Hasanbegovic at the 57th minute of the game, he went on to score a brace between the 88th and 89th minutes, providing his team with the equalizer and taking the match to the extra-time, although Ascoli eventually gained a 2–3 win. On 6 October 2022, Hilmir Rafn extended his contract with the club until June 2027.

The loan at Tromsø 
On 11 January 2023, Hilmir Rafn officially joined Norwegian side Tromsø IL on loan until the end of the year.

International career 
Hilmir Rafn has represented Iceland at various youth levels, having played for the under-19 and under-21 national teams.

References

External links
 
 

2004 births
Living people
Icelandic footballers
Association football forwards
Ungmennafélagið Fjölnir players
Venezia F.C. players
Tromsø IL players
1. deild players
Úrvalsdeild karla (football) players
Serie A players
Icelandic expatriate footballers
Expatriate footballers in Italy
Icelandic expatriate sportspeople in Italy
Expatriate footballers in Norway
Icelandic expatriate sportspeople in Norway